El Guabo is a town in El Oro, one of the provinces of Ecuador. It is the seat of El Guabo Canton. It is located a few kilometers from the provincial capital, Machala. The town has a bypass, so cars coming mainly from Guayaquil or Naranjal can drive towards Machala without passing it.

Populated places in El Oro Province